A siphon is a tube in an inverted U shape which enables a liquid, under the pull of gravity, to flow upwards and then downwards to discharge at a lower level.

Siphon may also refer to:

 Soda siphon, device used for dispensing carbonated water
 Siphon (insect anatomy)
 Siphon (mollusc), an organ of many aquatic molluscs through which water (or air) flows
 Oral siphon of Urochordata
 Siphon (horse), a racehorse
 Carotid siphon, a portion of the human internal carotid artery running through the cavernous sinus
 Siphon (cave), a passage in a cave that is submerged under water
 Anti-siphoning law, a term in television broadcasting
 GWR Siphon, a series of enclosed milk churn transport wagons built by the Great Western Railway